Uzbekistan State Institute of Arts and Culture (UzSIAC), based on the original Ostrovsky Institute and created by merging the Uzbekistan Institute of Arts and Tashkent State Institute of Culture in 2012, is a state-run higher education institution in Tashkent, Uzbekistan. It  is Central Asia’s major training school in the fields of cinema, television, theatre and design.

History
The institute was founded in June 1945 as theatre and artistic art institute named after Alexander Ostrovsky, with the aim of creating a training centre for theatre for the Central Asian Republics, which included the former Soviet Union states of Uzbekistan, Kazakhstan, Kyrgyzstan, Turkmenistan, Tajikistan and Karakalpakstan. The Uzbekistan State institute of Arts and Culture was established on 4 June 2012 by the presidential decree, merging the Uzbekistan Institute of Arts and the Tashkent State Institute of Culture, which was named after Abdullah Kadiri (Kadiri Institute?).

Description
There are more than 1600 students enrolled at both bachelor and master level; and 225 teaching staff providing tuition in both visual arts and performing arts (including cinema).

The institute consists of 3 faculties:
 Dramatic art
 Art of film, television and radio
 Folk art

Notable alumni 

 Timur Bekmambetov, (born 1961), Russian-Kazakh filmmaker
 Andrei Boltnev, (1946–1995), Russian actor
 Leonid Bronevoy, (1928–2017), Russian actor
 Sitora Farmonova, (born 1984), Uzbek film actress
 Galiya Izmaylova, (1923–2010), Uzbek ballerina
 Oydin Norboyeva, (born 1944), Uzbek actress 
 Alvina Shpady, (1935–2019), Uzbek artist and restorer
 Yalkin Tuychiev, (born 1977), Uzbek film director

References

External links 

  

Educational institutions established in 1945
Universities in Uzbekistan
Education in Tashkent
Buildings and structures in Tashkent
1945 establishments in Uzbekistan
Universities and institutes established in the Soviet Union